Euryurus leachii, or Leach's millipede, is a species of flat-backed millipede in the family Euryuridae. It is found in North America.

Subspecies
These two subspecies belong to the species Euryurus leachii:
 Euryurus leachii fraternus Hoffman, 1978
 Euryurus leachii leachii (Gray, 1832)

References

Further reading

External links

 

Polydesmida
Millipedes of North America
Articles created by Qbugbot
Animals described in 1832
Taxa named by George Robert Gray